The 1976 United States presidential election in Maryland was held on November 2, 1976 as part of the 1976 United States presidential election. Incumbent Republican President Gerald Ford of Michigan and his running mate Senator Bob Dole of Kansas lost to the Democratic challengers, Governor Jimmy Carter of Georgia and Senator Walter Mondale of Minnesota. Carter and Mondale won Maryland with 53.04% of the vote compared to Ford and Dole’s 46.96% – a comfortable margin of 6.08%.

After Nixon had won every county-equivalent in the state except for Baltimore City in 1972, Carter won 10 of 23 counties, most critically the populous Montgomery and Prince George’s Counties in the Washington metropolitan area and the Lower Southern counties of St. Mary’s, Charles and Calvert. In a 2-way contest, Ford did not win more than 61.2% (Carroll County and Talbot County) of the vote in any county. As of 2020, this is the last election in which a Democrat carried one of the three counties in Western Maryland, namely Allegany County, as well as the last time St. Mary’s, Calvert, and Cecil Counties have given Democrat majorities or pluralities in a presidential election. This is also the last time the Democrat has won a majority of the vote in Kent County.

Results

Results by county

Counties that flipped from Republican to Democratic
Allegany
Calvert
Cecil
Charles
Kent
Montgomery
Prince George's
Somerset
St. Mary's

See also
 United States presidential elections in Maryland
 1976 United States presidential election
 1976 United States elections

Notes

References 

Maryland
1976
Presidential